Nneka the Pretty Serpent is a two-part 1994 Nigerian horror drama film directed and written by Zeb Ejiro and produced by Okechukwu Ogunjiofor. It is regarded as the Nollywood movie that started the trend of storylines involving demon-possessed subjects who are cleansed by pastors.

Plot 
Nneka the Pretty Serpent follows the story of a woman who desperately wants to conceive a child of her own. In order to conceive, she meets the river goddess (also referred to as Mami Wata) for help. She promises to dedicate the child to the river goddess for her help. The woman in turn conceives and delivers a female child named Nneka. Nneka possesses supernatural powers which she uses to perpetuate evil; her aim is to seduce prominent married men in order to take their money and souls. Her evil deeds result in the ruination of Tony and the extermination of Chima Ogbonna's household.. Nneka was possessed by the queen mother spirit to kill six people that took her powers in the drama (NNEKA THE PRETTY SERPENT). Each and everyone of them had a weakness, the first person weakness was that he was addicted to woman, the second person who is Fatima by name was addicted to perfume

Cast 
 Ndidi Obi as Nneka
Okechukwu Ogunjiofor as Tony Chukwudifu Nwosu
Eucharia Anunobi
 Ngozi Ezeonu as Nkechi
 Rita Nzelu  as Ifeoma 'Ify'
 Sam Loco as Mazi Nwosu
 Kanayo O.Kanayo as Emeka
 James Iroha as Chima Ogbonna
 Claude Eke as Nneka's husband
 Nelly Uchendu as Mama Nwosu
 Zack Orji

Production and release
The film was shot in Igbo with English subtitles. It was set in Lagos.

Reception 
The film achieved commercial success despite being shot in Igbo Language and subtitled in English Language. Movies such as Karishika, Sakobi, Izaga, Highway to the Grave and Witches were said to have been influenced by Nneka the Pretty Serpent.

Remake 
The remake of Nneka the Pretty Serpent was announced in January 2020 by Charles Okpaleke of Play Network Studios. It was released in cinemas in December 2020 and distributed by Genesis Cinemas and Nairabox. Ndidi Obi was also featured in the remake.

References

1994 films
Nigerian horror films
Igbo-language films
Nigerian drama films